Papuamyr is a small genus of Melanesian jumping spiders native to Papua New Guinea. The genus was erected by Wayne Maddison and T. Szűts in 2019, and was placed into the tribe Myrmarachnini, within the Salticoida clade of Salticinae.  it contains only two species: P. omhifosga and P. pandora.

See also
 List of Salticidae genera

References

Salticidae genera
Arthropods of New Guinea